Calc or CALC may refer to:

 Short for calculation, calculator, or calculus
 Windows Calculator, also known by its filename 
 LibreOffice Calc, an open-source spreadsheet application similar to Microsoft Excel
 The Anglo-Saxon rune ᛣ, representing /k/
 The Calcarea class of calcareous sponges
 The Latin American and Caribbean Unity Summit, known in Spanish as the Cumbre de América Latina y el Caribe (CALC)
 The Canadian Association of Lutheran Congregations (CALC)

See also 
Calque
Calc–silicate rock